Luigi Zoja (born 1943) is an Italian psychoanalyst and writer. He took a degree in economics and did research in sociology during the late 1960s. Soon thereafter he studied at the C. G. Jung Institute in Zurich. After taking his diploma, Zoja returned to Zurich to work at a clinic for several years. He maintains a private practice in Milan. He also practiced for two years in New York City, during a period that bracketed the terrorist attacks on New York and Washington, D. C. He has taught regularly at the Zurich Jung Institute, and also on occasion at the Universities of Palermo and Insubria. From 1984 to 1993, Zoja was president of CIPA (Centro Italiano di Psicologia Analitica), and from 1998 to 2001 was president of the IAAP (International Association of Analytical Psychology). Later he chaired the IAAP's International Ethics Committee. His essays and books have appeared in 14 languages.

Most of his essays interpret present-day predicaments (addiction, limitless consumption, the absence of the father, hatred and paranoid projections in politics, etc.) by placing them in the light of persistent ancient patterns, as expressed in myth and classical literature. Archetypal psychologist James Hillman has called Zoja an "anthropological psychologist" as one way of indicating the range and depth of his thinking.

Books in Italian
 Problemi di psicologia analitica: una antologia post-junghiana. Napoli: Liguori  1983. .
 Nascere non basta: iniziazione e tossicodipendenza. 1st ed. Milano: Raffaello Cortina Editore 1985. . 2nd ed. Milano: Raffaello Cortina editore 2003. .
 Crescita e colpa: psicologia e limiti dello sviluppo. Milano: Anabasi 1993. .
 Coltivare l'anima Bergamo: Moretti & Vitali 1999. .
 Il gesto di Ettore: preistoria, storia, attualità e scomparsa del padre. Torino: Bollati Boringhieri 2000. . The book won the Premio Palmi award in 2001.
 L'incubo globale: prospettive junghiane a proposito dell'11 settembre James Hillman et al., ed. by Luigi Zoja. Torino: Bollati Boringhieri 2000. .
 Storia dell'arroganza: psicologia e limiti dello sviluppo. Bergamo: Moretti & Vitali 2003. .
 Giustizia e bellezza. Torino: Bollati Boringhieri 2007. .
 La morte del prossimo. Torino: Giulio Einaudi editore 2009. .
 Contro Ismene: considerazioni sulla violenza. Torino: Bollati Boringhieri 2009. .
 Centauri: mito e violenza maschile. Roma-Bari: Casa editrice Giuseppe Laterza & figli 2010. .
 Al di là delle intenzioni. Etica e analisi. Torino: Bollati Boringhieri 2011. .
 Paranoia, La follia che fa la storia., Torino, Bollati Boringhieri, 2011. . Utopie minimaliste Milano, Chiarelettere, 2013  Premio Nazionale Rhegium Julii Walter Mauro per la saggistica.
 Psiche, Torino, Bollati Boringhieri, 2015, .
 Il gesto di Ettore. Preistoria, storia, attualità e scomparsa del padre, Nuova edizione rivista, aggiornata e ampliata, Torino, Bollati Boringhieri, 2016, 
 Centauri. Alle radici della violenza maschile, Nuova edizione rivista, aggiornata e ampliata, Torino, Bollati Boringhieri, 2016 
 Nella mente di un terrorista. Conversazione con Omar Bellicini, Torino, Einaudi, 2017, 
 Vedere il vero e il falso, Torino, Einaudi, 2018, 
 Utopie minimaliste: ecologia profonda, psicologia e società, Milano, Chiarelettere, 2021, 
 Dialoghi sul male. Tre storie, Torino, Bollati Boringhieri, 2022, ISBN 9788833937847

Books in English
 Drugs, Addiction, and Initiation: The Modern Search for Ritual. 1st ed. Boston: Sigo, 1989; 2nd ed. Einsiedeln, CH: Daimon, 2000. .
 Growth and Guilt: Psychology and the Limits of Development. London: Routledge, 1995. .
 The Father: Historical, Psychological, and Cultural Perspectives. London & New York: Brunner-Routledge, 2001. . [Gradiva Award, 2002]
 Jungian Reflections on September 11: A Global Nightmare. Eds. Luigi Zoja and Donald Williams. Einsiedeln, CH: Daimon, 2002. .
 Cultivating the Soul. London: Free Association, 2005. .
 Ethics and Analysis. College Station: Texas A & M University Press, 2007.  . [Gradiva Award, 2009]
 Violence in History, Culture, and the Psyche: Essays. New Orleans: Spring Journal Books, 2009. .John Peck, "Zoja among Others: Between the Ego and a Hard Place," Afterword to Violence in History, Culture, and the Psyche: Essays (as above).
 Paranoia: The Madness that Makes History. London & New York: Routledge, 2017. 
 The Father: Historical, Psychological, and Cultural Perspectives''. New York: Routledge, 2018. .

References

See also
 Carl Jung
 Analytical Psychology
 James Hillman

1943 births
Living people
Italian psychoanalysts
Italian male writers